FS 271 was a North Sea convoy of the FS series which ran during World War II from Methil, East Coast of Scotland to Southend-on-Sea, Essex.

Ships in the convoy

References

Bibliography

External links
FS.271 at convoyweb

North Atlantic convoys of World War II
North Sea operations of World War II